The Aletsch Glacier or Great Aletsch Glacier is the largest glacier in the Alps. The Aletsch Glacier is composed of four smaller glaciers converging at Konkordiaplatz, where its thickness was measured by the ETH to be still near . It then continues towards the  valley before giving birth to the Massa. The Aletsch Glacier is – like most glaciers in the world today – a retreating glacier.

The whole area, including other glaciers is part of the  Protected Area, which was declared a UNESCO World Heritage Site in 2001.

Geography
The Aletsch Glacier is one of the many glaciers located between the cantons of Bern and Valais on the Bernese Alps located east of the Gemmi Pass. The whole area is considered to be the largest glaciated area in western Eurasia. The Fiescher and Aar Glaciers lying on the east have similar extensions.

Before reaching the maximum flow, four smaller glaciers converge at Konkordiaplatz:

This firn in fact represents the straight continuation of the Aletsch Glacier, yet is the shortest of the four tributary glaciers.
The mouth at the  it follows over a rise with a descent from 25 to 30 percent; here, the glacier is sharply split.

Further down, until about 1880, the  did also enter the Aletsch Glacier at its mouth. The river flows through the Lake  (a reservoir, and coincidentally representing the glacier's mouth region in the 19th century, which is a retreat of more than ) and a gorge of the same name before reaching the  near .

Tourism
The area of the Aletsch Glacier and some surrounding valleys is on the UNESCO World Heritage list, thus it is protected and the facilities are mostly restricted to the external zones. The  river can be crossed since 2008 by a suspension bridge, thus allowing hikes between the left and the right part of the glacier.

Hiking paths pass the  Hut or the Hollandia Hut, eventually reaching other glaciers in the massif.

The house is now one of the centers of the environmental organization Pro Natura, which hosts a permanent exhibition about the site.

Panorama

This firn is connected in the over the glacier pass  (3280 m high) to the  Glacier in the east.

The lowest part of the great Aletsch Glacier is largely covered with detritus of the lateral and medial moraines. The glacier's toe currently lies about 1560 m high, far beneath the local tree line. From it springs the Massa stream, which flows through the Massa Canyon and is used to generate hydroelectric power.

The great Aletsch Glacier shows considerable ice cover. At the Konkordiaplatz, it has an ice cover of more than 900 m, but as it moves to the south, the greater part of the ice melts, gradually decreasing the cover to around 150 m.

The characteristically dark medial moraine, situated almost in the middle of the glacier, runs protracted in two bands from the  along the whole length to the glacier's toe-zone. This medial moraine is collected from the ice of three large ice fields, which all run together.

Formation and evolution

The Aletsch Glacier resulted from the accumulation and compaction of snow. Glaciers generally form where snow and ice accumulation exceed snow and ice melt. As the snow and ice thicken it reaches a point where it begins to move due to a combination of gravity and pressure of the overlying snow and ice.

After an important retreat, the glacier again advanced 11,000 years ago during the last glacial period. Remaining moraines are still visible in the Aletsch Forest.

Since the last glaciation, the glacier generally retreated. However slight climatic changes happened and, in 1860, the glacier was 3 km longer and the ice level 200 m higher.

As for many other glaciers, records show a major longer-term retreat trend. The Aletsch Glacier receded by  since 1870, including  since 1980. A record retreat of  happened in 2006 alone.

Since the end of the Little Ice Age in 1850 the glacier has lost 20 percent of its ice mass, considerably less than other glaciers in Switzerland, which have lost up to 50 percent. This is explained with the large size of the Aletsch Glacier, which reacts much slower to climate change than smaller glaciers. It is however estimated that, by 2100, the glacier will have only one tenth of its 2018 ice mass.

Photo opportunity
On August 18, 2007, photographer Spencer Tunick used hundreds of naked people in a "living sculpture" on the Aletsch Glacier in a photo shoot which he said was intended to draw attention to global warming and the shrinking of the world's glaciers. The temperature was about 10 °C (50 °F) at the time of the photo shoot. The 600 participants on the shrinking glacier said that they had volunteered for Tunick (a collaboration with Greenpeace) to let the world know about the effects of global warming on the melting Swiss glaciers.

See also

List of glaciers in Switzerland
List of glaciers
Retreat of glaciers since 1850
Swiss Alps

Notes and references

Further reading

External links

Documentary film "Legacy of the Great Aletsch"
Swiss Alps Jungfrau-Aletsch UNESCO World Heritage
 Grosser Aletschgletscher on Glaciers online
Panoramic drawing of area including hikes
Interactive repeat photo comparisons of the Aletsch Glacier
Webcam overlooking Aletsch Glacier and Konkordiaplatz from Konkordia Hut

Glaciers of Valais
World Heritage Sites in Switzerland
Tourist attractions in Switzerland
Glaciers of the Alps